Childress is an unincorporated community in Goochland County, Virginia, United States.

References

Unincorporated communities in Goochland County, Virginia
Unincorporated communities in Virginia